KWLN (103.3 FM) is a radio station broadcasting a Spanish music format. Licensed to Wilson Creek, Washington, United States, the station is currently owned by Alpha Media LLC.

History
The station was assigned the call letters KVYF on August 21, 1992. On August 23, 2000, the station changed its call sign to KKXA and on October 22, 2001 to the current KWLN.

References

External links
La Nueva Radio Facebook

WLN
Alpha Media radio stations
Radio stations established in 1995
1995 establishments in Washington (state)